Mikkel Maigaard Jakobsen (born 20 September 1995) is a Danish professional footballer, who plays as an attacking midfielder for Norwegian side Sarpsborg 08 FF in the Eliteserien.

Club career

Esbjerg fB
Maigaard joined Esbjerg fB from Varde IF, when he was 13 years old.

Maigaard made his debut for the first team on 26 September 2013 against Aalborg Chang in the Danish Cup. He played a well match, and scored for Esbjerg in the 81' minute to 6–1. The game ended 7–1 to Esbjerg.

On 12 December 2013, Maigaard played his first professional game for Esbjerg fB. He started on the bench, but came on the pitch in the 82nd minute, where he replaced Jakob Ankersen in a Europa League match against Red Bull Salzburg, which Esbjerg lost 0–3.

In April 2014, Maigaard signed a new contract with Esbjerg, which expired in the summer 2015. The new contract contained, that he was going to join the first team squad in the summer 2014. Together with 3 other U19 players, Maigaard was moved to the first team squad in the summer 2014.

Brabrand IF
Some months after leaving Esbjerg in the summer 2015 where his contract expired, Maigaard signed with the Danish 2nd Division-side Brabrand IF.

ÍBV Vestmannaeyjar
On 1 February 2016 it was confirmed, that Maigaard had signed a 2-year contract with Icelandic Úrvalsdeild-side, ÍBV Vestmannaeyjar. After about one and a half year at the club, the manager of the club confirmed on 23 October 2017, that Maigaard wouldn't continue at the club. He left the club immediately.

Raufoss IL
Maigaard signed for Norwegian 2. divisjon-side Raufoss IL on 12 January 2018.

Strømsgodset
On 1 August 2019 Strømsgodset announced, that Maigaard had joined the club on a contract until the end of 2021.

Sarpsborg 08
On the last day of the summer transfermarket 2021–22, 31 August 2021, Maigaard joined fellow league club Sarpsborg 08 FF on a deal until the end of 2023.

Career statistics

Club

References

External links
 Mikkel Maigaard on Soccerway
 Mikkel Maigaard on DBU

1995 births
Living people
Danish men's footballers
Danish expatriate men's footballers
Denmark youth international footballers
People from Varde Municipality
Association football midfielders
Esbjerg fB players
Brabrand IF players
Íþróttabandalag Vestmannaeyja players
Raufoss IL players
Strømsgodset Toppfotball players
Sarpsborg 08 FF players
Danish Superliga players
Úrvalsdeild karla (football) players
Norwegian Second Division players
Norwegian First Division players
Eliteserien players
Expatriate footballers in Iceland
Expatriate footballers in Norway
Danish expatriate sportspeople in Iceland
Danish expatriate sportspeople in Norway
Sportspeople from the Region of Southern Denmark